Brayan Fabricio Reyes Colón (born 27 September 1991) is a Honduran footballer who plays as a midfielder.

References

External links
 

1991 births
Living people
Association football midfielders
Honduran footballers
FC Tulsa players
USL Championship players
Soccer players from New York (state)
Bryant and Stratton College alumni